The Gibson County Courthouse in Trenton, Tennessee was built in 1899.  It was listed on the National Register of Historic Places in  1976.

It is a two-and-one-half-story building with a polychromatic effect created by use of red and yellow brick and gray stone.

References

National Register of Historic Places in Gibson County, Tennessee
Neoclassical architecture in Tennessee
Government buildings completed in 1899